André Lussier was a physician, rheumatologist,  and professor at the School of Medicine of the Université de Sherbrooke, Quebec, Canada. He was born in 1933 in Sherbrooke and died in 2009 in Sherbrooke. He completed his classical studies and Baccalauréat ès-art at the Séminaire Oblat de Chambly and at the Collège de Montréal (Université de Montréal). He then completed his residency in internal medicine at the Hôpital Notre-Dame de Montréal. From 1963 to 1964, he pursued a "clinical and research fellowship" in rheumatology at the University of Pennsylvania under the supervision of Dr. Joseph Hollander. In 1969,  he joined the founding clinicians and researchers of the School of Medicine of the Université de Sherbrooke and he established the first Section of Rheumatology officially recognized in Québec. In 1970,  he wrote the white paper upon which the specialty of rheumatology is recognized in Québec, two years before its recognition as a specialty elsewhere in North America. In 1975, he co-founded The Journal of Rheumatology, of which he remained the co-Editor until his death. He was the first Director of the Clinical Research Center. of the  Centre Hospitalier Universitaire de Sherbrooke (CHUS) from 1980 to 1984. During his career, he was president of several scientific meetings and conferences (e.g.Canadian Society of Rheumatology, Pan-American League of Associations for Rheumatology PANLAR). He has published over 230 scientific articles and is the author of three books.

References

External links
Hommage à un grand chercheur et un grand philantrophe 
Chaire André Lussier de rhumatologie 
Distinguished Rheumatologist (1999) - Canadian Rheumatology Association

People from Sherbrooke
1933 births
2009 deaths
Collège de Montréal alumni
Université de Montréal alumni
Scientists from Quebec
Academic staff of the Université de Sherbrooke
Canadian rheumatologists
Physicians from Quebec
Canadian medical researchers
20th-century Canadian physicians
21st-century Canadian physicians
20th-century Canadian scientists
21st-century Canadian scientists